Christian Ernst Weiss (12 May 1833, in Eilenburg – 4 July 1890, in  Schkeuditz) was a German mineralogist, geologist and palaeontologist.
He is not to be confused with the historian Christian Ernst Weiße  (1766–1832).

Works 
 Ueber die krystallographische Entwicklung des Quarzsystems und über krystallographische Entwicklungen im Allgemeinen, Phil. Diss., H. W. Schmidt, Halle (Saale) 1859
 Die Mineralien der Freiberger Erzgänge: E. Weiss. Bevorwortet und mit Bemerkungen versehen von B. von Cotta, 1860
 Über Voltzia und andere Pflanzen des bunten Sandsteins zwischen der untern Saar und dem Rheine. Neues Jahrbuch für Mineralogie, Geologie und Palaeontologie, Jahrgang 1864, 279 – 294, Tafel V, Stuttgart 1864
 Beiträge zur Kenntniss der Feldspathbildung und Anwendung auf die Entstehung von Quarztrachyt und Quarzporphyr, 1866
 Begleitworte zur geognostischen Uebersichtskarte des kohlenführenden Saar-Rhein-Gebietes, 1868
 Gliederung der Trias im Saarbrückenschen. Neues Jahrbuch für Mineralogie, Geologie und Palaeontologie, Jahrgang 1869, 215 – 219, Stuttgart 1869
 Fossile Flora der jüngsten Steinkohlenformation und des Rothliegenden im Saar-Rhein-Gebiete: Nebst 20 Tafeln und Textfiguren, 1869
 Über Anomopteris Mougeoti. Neues Jahrbuch für Mineralogie, Geologie und Palaeontologie, Jahrgang 1871, 363 – 368, Stuttgart 1871
 Das Vorkommen kleiner Schalenreste aus dem unteren Buntsandstein von Dürrenberg, Provinz Sachsen. Zeitschrift der Deutschen Geologischen Gesellschaft, XXVII, 710–712, Berlin 1875
 Steinkohlen-Calamarien: mit besonderer Berücksichtigung ihrer Fructificationen, Neumann, 1876
 Ueber die Entwicklung der fossilen Floren in den geologischen Perioden, 1878
 Atlas von 3 lithographischen Tafeln zur Abhandlung über die Flora des Rothliegenden von Wünschendorf bei Lauban in Schlesien, 1879
 Die Krystallisationsgesetze seit Ch. S. Weiß, insbesondere die Lehre von der Hemiëdrie, erörtert am Diamant, 1880
 Ueber die vertikale Verbreitung der Steinkohlenpflanzen, 1881
 Die Steinkohlen-führenden Schichten bei Ballenstedt am nördlichen Harzrande, A. W. Schade's Buchdruckerei, 1882
 Ueber einige Pflanzenreste aus der Rubengrube bei Neurode in Nieder-Schliesen, 1884
 Zur Flora der ältesten Schichten des Harzes, 1884
 Petrographische Beiträge aus dem nördlichen Thüringer Walde, 1884
 Über eine Buntsandstein-Sigillaria und deren nächste Verwandte. Jahrbuch der Königlich Preussischen geologischen Landesanstalt und Bergakademie zu Berlin für das Jahr 1885, 356 – 361, Berlin 1886
 Die Sigillarien der preussischen Steinkohlengebiete. – I. Die Gruppe der Favularien, Simon Schropp'sche Hof-Landkartenhandlung (J. H. Neumann), Berlin 1887, Digitalisiert
 Beiträge zur fossilen Flora I–IV, 1888

References
Wilhelm von Gümbel: Weiß, Christian Ernst. In: Allgemeine Deutsche Biographie (ADB). Band 41, Duncker & Humblot, Leipzig 1896, S. 562 f.
Professor Dr. phil. Christian Ernst Weiss in Die Persönlichkeiten von Eilenburg, Books on Demand, Norderstedt 2012
Sterzel, Nachruf in Jahrbuch der PGLA für 1890, CIX, Archive

1833 births
1890 deaths
People from Eilenburg
People from the Province of Saxony
German mineralogists
19th-century German geologists
German paleontologists